Midt-Telemark is a traditional district of Norway situated in Vestfold og Telemark county.

It comprises three municipalities: Bø, Sauherad and Nome. The largest population centres in the region are Bø, Ulefoss, Bjervamoen and Gvarv, of which Ulefoss is the largest with 2,696 inhabitants.

Bø and Sauherad municipalities were created in 1837 when the formannskapsdistrikt laws came into effect. Lunde municipality was split from Bø in 1867, but merged with Holla in 1964 to form Nome municipality. When asked whether Bø, Sauherad and Nome should merge to form one municipality comprising all of Midt-Telemark (municipality), the percentage who were positive to such a merger were 64% in Sauherad, 59% in Bø and 48% in Nome.

References

 
Districts of Vestfold og Telemark